

Tenga may refer to:

Historical currency
 Bukharan tenga, in Central Asia
 Khwarazmi tenga, in Central Asia
 Kokand tenga, in Central Asia
 Khiva tenga, in Central Asia

Geography
 Tenga Valley, Arunachal Pradesh India
 Tenga River
 Tenga, Altai Republic, a rural locality in Russia
 Tenga, Mozambique, a town
 Tenga, Mull, a place on the Isle of Mull, Argyll and Bute, Scotland

Other
 Tenga (company), a Japanese manufacturer of adult toys
 Fictional villains, see List of Power Rangers villains

See also

 Tegna (disambiguation)